Jennifer Carroll (born June 4, 1981) is a Canadian former swimmer.

Career
Carroll was born in Montreal and first competed for Canada at the 2001 World Championships in Fukuoka, Japan, where she finished 18th in the 100 metre backstroke in 1:04.49 and 21st in the 50 metre backstroke in 30.02.

At the 2002 FINA World Swimming Championships (25 m) in Moscow, Carroll won gold in the 50 metre backstroke in a championships record time of 27.38. In the 100 metre backstroke, Carroll finished in 15th posting a time of 29.03 in the semi final.

At the 2002 Commonwealth Games in Manchester, Carroll won silver in the 50 metre backstroke in 29.05.

At the 2003 World Championships in Barcelona, Carroll finished 4th in the 50 metre backstroke in 28.65, 15th in the 100 metre backstroke in 1:03.08 and 22nd in the 50 metre butterfly in 28.25.

At the 2005 World Championships in Montreal, Carroll finished 18th in the 50 metre backstroke in 29.55, 34th in the 50 metre freestyle in 26.69 and 34th in the 50 metre butterfly in 28.33.

At the 2005 Summer Universiade in İzmir, Turkey, Carroll won silver in the 50 metre backstroke in 29.32, finished 8th in the 100 metre backstroke in 1:03.80 and with Kathleen Stoody, Erin Miller and Chanelle Charron-Watson finished 7th in the 4 × 100 metre medley relay in 4:15.49.

At the 2007 Summer Universiade in Bangkok, Thailand, Carroll finished 4th in the 50 metre backstroke in 29.20, 18th in the 50 metre butterfly in 27.94 and 19th in the 50 metre freestyle in 26.41.

At the 2008 FINA World Swimming Championships (25 m) in Manchester, Carroll finished 7th in the 50 metre backstroke in 27.37, 13th in the 50 metre butterfly in 26.65, 15th in the 100 metre backstroke in 59.86 and 20th in the 50 metre freestyle in 25.72.

At the 2009 Summer Universiade in Belgrade, Serbia, Carroll finished 9th in the 50 metre butterfly in 27.07, 11th in the 50 metre backstroke in 29.19 and 30th in the 50 metre freestyle in 26.56.

Controversy
At the medal presentation for the women's 50 metre backstroke at the 2002 Commonwealth Games, Carroll was seen waving the flag of Quebec. Dave Johnson, Carroll's coach, called for her to be suspended. Swimming Canada ultimately decided not to suspend Carroll, even though she violated a signed agreement, mandated by the Commonwealth Games, that prohibits athletes from carrying provincial flags on the podium. Instead, a disciplinary committee ordered her in November to write a letter to her teammates and apologize to the board. She did both. Carroll stated that the move was not political gesture but was just simply of way of thanking the people in her home province who have supported her.

References

1981 births
Living people
Swimmers from Montreal
Canadian female backstroke swimmers
Canadian female butterfly swimmers
Commonwealth Games silver medallists for Canada
Swimmers at the 2002 Commonwealth Games
Medalists at the FINA World Swimming Championships (25 m)
Commonwealth Games medallists in swimming
Universiade medalists in swimming
Place of birth missing (living people)
Universiade silver medalists for Canada
Medalists at the 2005 Summer Universiade
21st-century Canadian women
Medallists at the 2002 Commonwealth Games